Philip N. Wisner (July 1869 – July 5, 1936) was a professional baseball player. Wisner played one game in Major League Baseball for Washington Senators in 1895 as a shortstop. Although he did not have a plate appearance, he fielded four total chances, three of which resulted in an error.

Wisner was born in and died in Washington, D.C.

External links

Major League Baseball shortstops
Washington Senators (1891–1899) players
Twin Cities Hustlers players
Baseball players from Washington, D.C.
19th-century baseball players
American people of German descent
1869 births
1936 deaths